The 1986 WTA Argentine Open was a women's tennis tournament played on outdoor clay courts at the Buenos Aires Lawn Tennis Club in Buenos Aires, Argentina and was part of the Category 1 tier of the 1987 Virginia Slims World Championship Series. It was the inaugural edition of the tournament and was held from 1 December until 8 December 1986. First-seeded Gabriela Sabatini won the singles title.

Leaders

Singles
 Gabriela Sabatini defeated  Arantxa Sánchez Vicario 6–1, 6–1
 It was Sabatini's 1st title of the year and the 2nd of her career.

Doubles
 Lori McNeil /  Mercedes Paz defeated  Manon Bollegraf /  Nicole Jagerman 6–1, 2–6, 6–1

References

External links
 ITF tournament edition details

WTA Argentine Open
WTA Argentine Open
WTA Argentine Open